The Inwood Formation is a geologic formation in Manitoba. The silty and salty dolomites preserve fossils dating back to the Telychian stage of the Silurian period.

Fossil content 
The following fossils have been reported from the formation:

Trilobites 
 ?Encrinurus tuberculifrons

Ostracods 
 Leperditia hisingeri

Strophomenata 

 Brachyprion cf. inflata
 Fardenia ellipsoides
 F. transversalis
 Fardenia cf. elegans

Rhynchonellata 
 Camarotoechia indianensis
 Hyattidina junea

Gastropods 
 Coelocaulus sp.
 Gastropoda indet.

Cephalopods 
 Lowoceras imbricatum
 Mandaloceras parvulum

Stromatoporoidea 
 Clathrodictyon drummondense
 Clathrodictyon cf. striatellum

Corals 

 Amplexoides severnensis
 Asthenophyllum inwoodense
 Favosites cf. niagarensis
 Halysites catenularia
 Neozaphrentis tyrrelli
 Paleofavosites poulseni
 P. transiens

See also 
 List of fossiliferous stratigraphic units in Manitoba

References

Bibliography 
 

Silurian System of North America
Silurian Manitoba
Telychian
Dolomite formations
Evaporite deposits
Silurian southern paleotropical deposits
Paleontology in Manitoba